A list of films produced in Latvia since 1991. For an A-Z list see :Category:Latvian films

Before 1962

1962–1990

1991–1999

2000–2009

2010s

External links
 asc Films with Latvia as primary country of origin (by year/ascending) at the Internet Movie Database
National Film Centre of Latvia catalogs of Latvian films since 2005